Abdul Latif Bhuiyan ( – 17 June 2015) was a Bangladeshi politician from Kishoreganj belonging to Jatiya Party. He was a member of the Jatiya Sangsad.

Biography
Bhuiyan was the president of Kishoreganj unit of Jatiya Party. He was elected as a member of the Jatiya Sangsad from Kishoreganj-5 as an Jatiya Party in candidate 1988 Bangladeshi general election. He was elected a Member of Parliament from Kishoreganj-7 constituency as an Bangladesh Nationalist Party candidate in 1991 Bangladeshi general election.

Bhuiyan died of cardiac arrest on 17 June 2015 at his own home in Kishoreganj at the age of 65.

References

2015 deaths
People from Kishoreganj District
4th Jatiya Sangsad members
Jatiya Party politicians
5th Jatiya Sangsad members